Feizi  (died 858 BC), also known by the title Qin Ying, was the founder of the ancient Chinese state of Qin, predecessor of the Qin Dynasty that would conquer all other Chinese states and unite China in 221 BC.

Mythical origin of Qin
According to the founding myths of Qin recorded in the Records of the Grand Historian by Han Dynasty historian Sima Qian, Feizi descended from the mythical Yellow Emperor and his grandson and successor Zhuanxu.  Zhuanxu's granddaughter Nüxiu (女脩) gave birth to Daye (大業) after swallowing an egg of a swallow.  Daye's son Boyi (伯益) was awarded the ancestral name Ying (嬴) by the mythical Chinese ruler Shun.

Ancestry
During the Shang Dynasty, Boyi's descendant Zhongjue was in charge of Xichui (西垂, also called Quanqiu, in present-day Li County, Gansu) in the midst of the Rong tribes.  Zhongjue's son Feilian (蜚廉) and grandson Elai served King Zhou of Shang, and Elai was killed when King Wu of Zhou overthrew Shang and founded the Zhou Dynasty.  Feizi's father Daluo (大骆) was the great-great-grandson of Elai.  However, Daluo's legal heir was not Feizi, but his other son , because Cheng was born to Daluo's main wife, daughter of the Marquess of the state of Shen.

Founding of Qin
Feizi lived in Xichui and was a skilled horse breeder. King Xiao of Zhou learned of his reputation and put him in charge of breeding and training horses for the Zhou army.  To reward his contributions, King Xiao wanted to make Feizi his father's legal heir instead of his half-brother Cheng.  However, Marquess of Shen, Cheng's grandfather, objected and said that the Rong people would revolt if the king deposed Cheng.  The king changed his mind and awarded Feizi the small fief of Qin instead (in present-day Zhangjiachuan County, Gansu), separate from his father's fief of Xichui, and gave Feizi the title Qin Ying, a combination of his fief and ancestral name.

This was the beginning of the State of Qin that would over six centuries later conquer all other states and unify China under the rule of Qin Shi Huang, the First Emperor of the Qin Dynasty.  At this time Qin was only a minor state classified as an "attached state" (附庸, fuyong), and Feizi did not receive any nobility rank.  Qin would not become a major vassal state until five generations later, when King Ping of Zhou granted Duke Xiang of Qin a formal nobility rank and recognition as a feudal lord for protecting the king during the invasion of the Quanrong nomads.

After death
Feizi died in 858 BC and was succeeded by his son, known as the Marquis of Qin.  In 842 BC the Rong people rebelled, destroying the clan of Feizi's half-brother at Xichui.  Twenty years later, Feizi's great-grandson Qin Zhong was also killed by the Rong in 822 BC.  However, Qin Zhong's son and successor Duke Zhuang of Qin defeated the Rong and annexed Xichui, thus reuniting the territories of the two branches of the House of Ying.

Notes

References

Year of birth unknown
Rulers of Qin
9th-century BC Chinese monarchs
858 BC deaths
Founding monarchs